This is a list of the main career statistics of Italian professional tennis player Matteo Berrettini. All statistics are according to the ATP Tour and ITF websites.

Performance timelines

Singles
Current through the 2023 Australian Open.

Doubles
Current through the 2022 ATP Cup.

Grand Slam finals

Singles: 1 (1 runner-up)

Other significant finals

Masters 1000 tournaments

Singles: 1 (1 runner-up)

ATP career finals

Singles: 12 (7 titles, 5 runner-ups)

Doubles: 3 (2 titles, 1 runner-up)

ATP Challenger and ITF Futures finals

Singles: 12 (5 titles, 7 runner–ups)

Doubles: 5 (4 titles, 1 runner–up)

Ultimate Tennis Showdown

Record against other players

Record against top 10 players
Berrettini's match record against those who have been ranked in the top 10, with those who are active in boldface:

Record against players ranked 11–20
Berrettini's match record against those who have been ranked no 11–20. Active players are in boldface.

 Nikoloz Basilashvili 4–1
 Cristian Garín 2–1
 Marco Cecchinato 1–0
 Borna Ćorić 1–0
 Pablo Cuevas 1–0
 Philipp Kohlschreiber 1–0
 Nick Kyrgios 1–0
 Feliciano López 1–0
 Viktor Troicki 1–0
 Alex de Minaur 1–1
 Kyle Edmund 1–1
 Andreas Seppi 1–1
 Frances Tiafoe 1–1
 Hyeon Chung 0–1
 Lorenzo Musetti 0–1
 Reilly Opelka 0–1
 Sam Querrey 0–1

*

Wins over top 10 players
He has a  record against players who were, at the time the match was played, ranked in the top 10.

*

Best Grand Slam results details

Grand Slam seedings

ATP Tour career earnings
 
* Statistics correct .

See also

 Italian players best ranking
 Best result of an Italian tennis player in Grand Slam

Notes

References

Berrettini
Sport in Italy